Parornix carpinella is a moth of the family Gracillariidae. It is found from Sweden to the Pyrenees, Italy and Greece and from Great Britain to Russia.

The wingspan is 8–10 mm.

The larvae feed on Acer platanoides, Acer pseudoplatanus, Carpinus betulus, Carpinus orientalis and Ostrya carpinifolia. They mine the leaves of their host plant. The mine consists of a small, angular, full depth blotch, often in a vein axle. The larva deposits some silk in the mine, but the quantity is so low that the mine remains practically flat. Later the larva leaves the mine and continues feeding within a down folded leaf margin or leaf tip.

References

Parornix
Moths of Europe
Moths described in 1863